Krestovsky Ostrov is a station on the Frunzensko-Primorskaya Line of Saint Petersburg Metro, opened on September 3, 1999. It should have been opened earlier but the opening was postponed due to delays in the construction of the station lobby. It serves Krestovsky Island and Krestovsky Stadium, home of FC Zenit Saint Petersburg.

Transport 
Buses: 10, 14, 25, 29, 220, 227.

Saint Petersburg Metro stations
Railway stations in Russia opened in 1999
Railway stations located underground in Russia